Branch and bound (BB, B&B, or BnB)  is a method for solving optimization problems by breaking them down into smaller sub-problems and using a bounding function to eliminate sub-problems that cannot contain the optimal solution. It is an algorithm  design paradigm for discrete and combinatorial optimization problems, as well as mathematical optimization. A branch-and-bound algorithm consists of a systematic enumeration of candidate solutions by means of state space search: the set of candidate solutions is thought of as forming a rooted tree with the full set at the root. The algorithm explores branches of this tree, which represent subsets of the solution set. Before enumerating the candidate solutions of a branch, the branch is checked against upper and lower estimated bounds on the optimal solution, and is discarded if it cannot produce a better solution than the best one found so far by the algorithm.

The algorithm depends on efficient estimation of the lower and upper bounds of regions/branches of the search space. If no bounds are available, the algorithm degenerates to an exhaustive search.

The method was first proposed by Ailsa Land and Alison Doig whilst carrying out research at the London School of Economics sponsored by British Petroleum in 1960 for discrete programming, and has become the most commonly used tool for solving NP-hard optimization problems. The name "branch and bound" first occurred in the work of Little et al. on the traveling salesman problem.

Overview
The goal of a branch-and-bound algorithm is to find a value  that maximizes or minimizes the value of a real-valued function , called an objective function, among some set  of admissible, or candidate solutions. The set  is called the search space, or feasible region. A B&B algorithm operates according to two principles:

 It recursively splits the search space into smaller spaces, then minimizing  on these smaller spaces; the splitting is called branching.
 Branching alone would amount to brute-force enumeration of candidate solutions and testing them all. To improve on the performance of brute-force search, a B&B algorithm keeps track of bounds on the minimum that it is trying to find, and uses these bounds to "prune" the search space, eliminating candidate solutions that it can prove will not contain an optimal solution.

Turning these principles into a concrete algorithm for a specific optimization problem requires some kind of data structure that represents sets of candidate solutions. Such a representation is called an instance of the problem. The instance representation has to come with three operations:

(Typically, the subsets are disjoint to prevent the algorithm from visiting the same candidate solution twice, but this is not required. However, an optimal solution among  must be contained in at least one of the subsets.)
  determines whether  represents a single candidate solution. (Optionally, if it does not, the operation may choose to return some feasible solution from among .) If  returns a solution then  provides an upper bound for the optimal objective value over the whole space of feasible solutions.

Using these operations, a B&B algorithm performs a top-down recursive search through the tree of instances formed by the branch operation. Upon visiting an instance , it checks whether  is equal or greater than the current upper bound; if so,  may be safely discarded from the search and the recursion stops. This pruning step is usually implemented by maintaining a global variable that records the minimum upper bound seen among all instances examined so far.

Generic version
The following is the skeleton of a generic branch and bound algorithm for minimizing an arbitrary objective function . As such, the generic algorithm presented here is a higher-order function.

 Using a heuristic, find a solution  to the optimization problem. Store its value, . (If no heuristic is available, set  to infinity.)  will denote the best solution found so far, and will be used as an upper bound on candidate solutions.
 Initialize a queue to hold a partial solution with none of the variables of the problem assigned.
 Loop until the queue is empty:
Record it and set .
For each of these:
 If , do nothing; since the lower bound on this node is greater than the upper bound of the problem, it will never lead to the optimal solution, and can be discarded.
 Else, store  on the queue.

Several different queue data structures can be used. This FIFO queue-based implementation yields a breadth-first search. A stack (LIFO queue) will yield a depth-first algorithm. A best-first branch and bound algorithm can be obtained by using a priority queue that sorts nodes on their lower bound. Examples of best-first search algorithms with this premise are Dijkstra's algorithm and its descendant A* search. The depth-first variant is recommended when no good heuristic is available for producing an initial solution, because it quickly produces full solutions, and therefore upper bounds.

Pseudocode 
A C++-like pseudocode implementation of the above is:
// C++-like implementation of branch and bound, 
// assuming the objective function f is to be minimized
CombinatorialSolution branch_and_bound_solve(
    CombinatorialProblem problem, 
    ObjectiveFunction objective_function /*f*/,
    BoundingFunction lower_bound_function /*bound*/) 
{
    // Step 1 above
    double problem_upper_bound = std::numeric_limits<double>::infinity; // = B
    CombinatorialSolution heuristic_solution = heuristic_solve(problem); // x_h
    problem_upper_bound = objective_function(heuristic_solution); // B = f(x_h)
    CombinatorialSolution current_optimum = heuristic_solution;
    // Step 2 above
    queue<CandidateSolutionTree> candidate_queue;
    // problem-specific queue initialization
    candidate_queue = populate_candidates(problem);
    while (!candidate_queue.empty()) { // Step 3 above
        // Step 3.1
        CandidateSolutionTree node = candidate_queue.pop();
        // "node" represents N above
        if (node.represents_single_candidate()) { // Step 3.2
            if (objective_function(node.candidate()) < problem_upper_bound) {
                current_optimum = node.candidate();
                problem_upper_bound = objective_function(current_optimum);
            }
            // else, node is a single candidate which is not optimum
        }
        else { // Step 3.3: node represents a branch of candidate solutions
            // "child_branch" represents N_i above
            for (auto&& child_branch : node.candidate_nodes) {
                if (lower_bound_function(child_branch) <= problem_upper_bound) {
                    candidate_queue.enqueue(child_branch); // Step 3.3.2
                }
                // otherwise, bound(N_i) > B so we prune the branch; step 3.3.1
            }
        }
    }
    return current_optimum;
}

In the above pseudocode, the functions heuristic_solve and populate_candidates called as subroutines must be provided as applicable to the problem.

Improvements

Applications 

This approach is used for a number of NP-hard problems:
 Integer programming
 Nonlinear programming
 Travelling salesman problem (TSP)
 Quadratic assignment problem (QAP)
 Maximum satisfiability problem (MAX-SAT)
 Nearest neighbor search (by Keinosuke Fukunaga)
 Flow shop scheduling
 Cutting stock problem
 Computational phylogenetics
 Set inversion
 Parameter estimation
 0/1 knapsack problem
 Set cover problem
 Feature selection in machine learning
 Structured prediction in computer vision
 Arc routing problem, including Chinese Postman problem
 Talent Scheduling, scenes shooting arrangement problem

Branch-and-bound may also be a base of various heuristics. For example, one may wish to stop branching when the gap between the upper and lower bounds becomes smaller than a certain threshold. This is used when the solution is "good enough for practical purposes" and can greatly reduce the computations required. This type of solution is particularly applicable when the cost function used is noisy or is the result of statistical estimates and so is not known precisely but rather only known to lie within a range of values with a specific probability.

Relation to other algorithms
Nau et al. present a generalization of branch and bound that also subsumes the A*, B* and alpha-beta search algorithms.

Optimization Example 
Branch and bound can be used to solve this problem

Maximize  with these constraints

The first step is to relax the integer constraint.

This is a convex hull region so the solution lies on one of the vertices of the region. We test the other endpoints by sweeping the line over the region and find this is the maximum over the reals.  

We choose the variable with the maximum fractional part, in this case  becomes the parameter for the branch and bound method. We have reached an integer solution so we move to the other branch . We obtain 275.75 @. We try the other branch  and there are no feasible solutions.

See also
 Backtracking
 Branch-and-cut, a hybrid between branch-and-bound and the cutting plane methods that is used extensively for solving integer linear programs.
 Alpha-beta pruning

References

External links 
 LiPS – Free easy-to-use GUI program intended for solving linear, integer and goal programming problems.
 Cbc – (Coin-or branch and cut) is an open-source mixed integer programming solver written in C++.

Optimization algorithms and methods
Combinatorial optimization